Microleropsis rufimembris is a species of beetle in the family Cerambycidae, and the only species in the genus Microleropsis. It was described by Gressitt in 1937.

References

Gyaritini
Beetles described in 1937